The Satakunta Air Command  (abbr. SatLsto) is a peace-time Finnish Air Force unit. Its headquarters is not located in the present-day province of Satakunta, but in historical Satakunta and in the present-day province of Pirkanmaa, at the Tampere-Pirkkala Airport in Pirkkala.

It is responsible for maintaining the prerequisites for operation in Southern Finland for the Finnish Air Force. It studied and developed air combat procedures and equipment. It operated from bases in Southern Finland, also supporting Finnish Army troops.

History 
The Satakunta Wing was founded on 26 June 1918 in Sortavala and was moved to Suur-Merijoki, near Vyborg in 1938. The unit was disbanded after the Winter War, but restated in Aunus in 1942. In 1944 the unit was moved to Pori Airport and it was equipped with Messerschmitt Bf 109s. It was the first unit of the Finnish Air Force to be equipped with jet aircraft, when it received its De Havilland Vampires. It was later to receive Folland Gnats and MiG-21s. The unit was renamed into the "Satakunta Wing" in 1957 and the headquarters was moved to Tampere in 1965. The 21st Fighter Squadron was moved to the Pirkkala Airport in 1985 and it was the first unit to be equipped with F-18 Hornet fighters in 1995.

The 21st Fighter Squadron was the operational unit of the wing. It was disbanded in summer 2014, with fighters relocated to Karelian Air Command and Lapland Air Command. At the same time, Satakunta Air Command was given new tasks: transport flights and flight research. The former flight research center in Halli was amalgamated into Satakunta Air Command's air combat center.

Organization 
Headquarters
Supporting Air Operations Squadron
Air Combat Centre
Aircraft Maintenance Squadron
Communications Flight
Logistics Flight
Force Protection Squadron

References

External links 
 About us - Ilmavoimat - The Finnish Air Force

Finnish Air Force
Pirkkala